Alison Emery (born 9 September 1989 in Brighton, England) plays for Great Britain women's national ice hockey team as defenseman.

References

1989 births
English women's ice hockey players
Living people
People from Blackpool